1000 Ways to Die is an American docufiction anthology television series that aired on Spike from May 14, 2008 to July 15, 2012, and also aired on Comedy Central during its run. The program recreates unusual supposed deaths, true events, and debunked urban legends, and includes interviews with real medical experts who describe the science behind each death. Up until the end of season one, the final story of each episode showed actual footage of dangerous situations that almost ended in death, along with interviews of those involved in the situations. A portion of these deaths have been nominated for or have received a Darwin Award. Ron Perlman served as the narrator on every episode since the third episode (with Thom Beers narrating the first two episodes); beginning with the episode "Tweets from the Dead", Joe Irwin was featured as the replacement narrator.

Spike burned off the final four episodes, ending the series with the airing of "Death, The Final Frontier." 1000 Ways to Die was canceled after the producers and stars of the show ran a strike against the network.

Opening sequence
U.S. version of Warning

UK version of Warning

First version (only used in the first two episodes)

Second version

Stylization
1000 Ways to Die takes a tongue-in-cheek dark humor approach to death through its presentation of stories derived from both myths and science, and the show makes liberal use of artistic license to significantly embellish or change the circumstances of real-life incidents that resulted in death for greater entertainment value. Not only are the names changed, but also substantial amounts of the locations, dates and context. Four notable exceptions are the accurate descriptions of the deaths of Harry Houdini, Jack Daniel, Mary Mallon, and Sigurd Eysteinsson, although the latter's death was depicted as having occurred in Norway but in actuality it occurred in Scotland.

A frequently recurring motif is that of unsympathetic or unintelligent individuals' choices backfiring on them, resulting in death.

Some of the deaths resemble real life events they are based on, for example death No. 197 – "Dead Eye" was based on the real life death of Jon Desborough.

Some take enormous poetic license with the truth. For example, death No. 692 – "Gone Fission", a story of two hapless Yemeni terrorists in 2009, implausibly attempting to build an atomic bomb, was based on the real Demon Core accident involving U.S. scientist Harry Daghlian in 1945.

Some of the stories include elements of truth, for example No. 396 – "Onesie & Donesie," where an accident-prone TV shopping network host is injured by a collapsing ladder, stabbed by the tip of a broken katana, then finally burned to death when a onesie he is wearing catches fire. The ladder collapse happened to Harold McCoo on the Cable Value Network in 1988, although he was unhurt. The katana incident happened to Shawn Leflar on The Knife Collector's Show on the Shop at Home Network in 2001. However, the third part of the story is made up.

The show is filled with black humor (particularly in the narration) which tempers the otherwise somber theme of death. It portrays the deaths using live-action recreations of the events along with expert and sometimes witness testimony, also using graphic computer-generated imagery animations, similar to those used in the popular TV show CSI, to illustrate the ways people have died, similar to the "X-Ray moves" of the 2011 reboot of Mortal Kombat and Mortal Kombat X, due to them showing bones being fractured and organs being damaged. A narration provides background information within each death-story, which all end with titles that are puns on popular figures of speech.

Seasons

See also
 1000 Ways to Lie - A spin-off series to 1000 Ways to Die.
 Final Destination - A horror film franchise which also feature people dying in an unusual manner.
 Happy Tree Friends - An adult animated series which features cute cartoon animals dying in an unusual manner.
 List of unusual deaths - Some of the deaths on this list served as inspiration for episode segments.

References

External links

2008 American television series debuts
2012 American television series endings
2000s American anthology television series
2010s American anthology television series
2000s American black comedy television series
2010s American black comedy television series
2000s American horror television series
2010s American horror television series
English-language television shows
Spike (TV network) original programming
Television series by Original Productions
Television series by Fremantle (company)
Television series featuring reenactments
Television shows about death